Christophia trilineella is a species of snout moth in the genus Christophia. It was described by Émile Louis Ragonot in 1887, and is known from Uzbekistan.

The wingspan is about 17 mm.

References

Moths described in 1887
Phycitini